My Love. My Way. is an album by Iowa hardcore quintet Modern Life is War. The album was originally released via Martyr Records; Deathwish Inc. now handles all Modern Life Is War reissues. The reissued and remastered version of My Love. My Way. contains two additional songs from the M.L.I.W. 7" E.P.

Track listing

Personnel
 Tyler - Drums
 Matt - Guitar
 Jeff - Vocals
 John - Guitar
 Chris - Bass

Album information
 Recorded in March 2003 at Atomic Recording Company in Brooklyn, N.Y. 
 Dean Baltulonis – Audio Engineering
 Bob Strakele – Audio Engineering
 Matt Henderson – Audio Engineering
 Bice - Assistant Engineering
 All songs written by Modern Life Is War
 Reissue remasted by Nick Zampiello at New Alliance
 House Photography - Christopher Cannon
 Original Design and Art Direction - Christopher Cannon and Jacob Bannon

2003 albums
Modern Life Is War albums
Deathwish Inc. albums
Albums with cover art by Jacob Bannon